David Patrick Maxwell Fyfe, 1st Earl of Kilmuir,  (29 May 1900 – 27 January 1967), known as Sir David Maxwell Fyfe from 1942 to 1954 and as Viscount Kilmuir from 1954 to 1962, was a British Conservative politician, lawyer and judge who combined an industrious and precocious legal career with political ambitions that took him to the offices of Solicitor General, Attorney General, Home Secretary and Lord High Chancellor of Great Britain.

One of the prosecuting counsels at the Nuremberg Trials, he subsequently played a role in drafting the European Convention on Human Rights. As Home Secretary he led a crackdown against homosexuals in the UK in the 1950s, and declined to commute Derek Bentley's death sentence for the murder of a police officer. His political ambitions were ultimately dashed in Harold Macmillan's cabinet reshuffle of July 1962.

Early life
Born in Edinburgh, the only son of William Thomson Fyfe, Headmaster of Aberdeen Grammar School, by his second wife Isabella Campbell, daughter of David Campbell, of Dornoch, co. Sutherland, he was educated at George Watson's College and Balliol College, Oxford, where, perhaps owing to his interest in politics, he achieved a third-class degree in Greats. Whilst at Oxford, he was a member of the Stubbs Society. His academic education was paused during his service in the Scots Guards in 1918–19, at the end of the World War I.  After graduation, he worked for the British Commonwealth Union as political secretary to Sir Patrick Hannon MP, studying law in his spare time. He entered Gray's Inn and was called to the bar in 1922. He became a pupil of George Lynskey in Liverpool then joined his chambers to practise.

Not pausing before beginning his political career in earnest, he stood as a Conservative for Wigan in 1924, an unwinnable parliamentary seat. He cultivated the more winnable Spen Valley until 1929 when the party resolved not to oppose sitting Liberal Member of Parliament (MP) Sir John Simon while he was absent on the Simon Commission in India. Maxwell Fyfe was eventually elected to Parliament in Liverpool West Derby in a by-election in July 1935.

Meanwhile, Maxwell Fyfe's legal career had prospered. In 1934 he became King's Counsel. He was Recorder of Oldham from 1936 to 1942.

Early political career
Maxwell Fyfe, along with Patrick Spens, Derrick Gunston and others, backed the National Government over the Hoare–Laval Pact, and he supported Neville Chamberlain over the Munich Agreement. However, after the German occupation of Czechoslovakia in March 1939, Maxwell Fyfe joined the Territorial Army and, at the outbreak of World War II in September, he was deployed to the Judge Advocate-General's department with rank of major. He was badly injured in an air raid in September 1940. In May 1941 Maxwell Fyfe became deputy to Rab Butler's chairmanship of a Conservative Party committee to analyse forthcoming post-war problems, taking over from Butler in July 1943.

Into government and on to Nuremberg

In March 1942, Sir Winston Churchill, on the advice of Brendan Bracken, appointed Maxwell Fyfe Solicitor-General. At the same time he was knighted and sworn of the Privy Council. He applied himself to his work in the wartime coalition government with enormous industry and began some of the thinking and planning about how the leaders of the Nazi regime in Germany might be brought to account after the war. As part of his duties, on 8 April 1945, he attended an Anglo-American discussion over the war crimes trial, at which, says the historian Richard Overy, "he presented the standard British argument for summary execution." Whether Maxwell Fyfe believed such executions were the best method of dealing with the Nazis may be doubted, in view of his later work at the Nuremberg Trials; at the time, however, as a member of the government he had little choice but to follow the lead of the Prime Minister, Churchill, who repeatedly urged that summary justice be visited upon the Nazi leaders. When the war in Europe ended and the coalition was dissolved in May 1945, Maxwell Fyfe was briefly Attorney-General in Churchill's caretaker government.

The Labour Party won a landslide victory in the United Kingdom general election of 1945 and Sir Hartley Shawcross became Attorney General and took responsibility as Britain's chief prosecutor in the Nuremberg Trials. Shawcross, to emphasise the non-partisan nature of the trials, appointed Maxwell Fyfe his deputy. Shawcross was largely committed to his political duties in Westminster and played little part other than delivering the opening and closing speeches. Maxwell Fyfe took on most of the day-to-day responsibilities as "capable lawyer, efficient administrator and concerned housemaster". There were misgivings in some quarters as to how Fyfe would perform, cross-examination not being regarded as one of his strengths. However, his cross-examination of Hermann Göring was one of the most noted cross-examinations in history.

Opposition
After Nuremberg, Maxwell Fyfe returned to Parliament to shadow the Minister of Labour while simultaneously pursuing a full, busy and prominent career at the Bar, for example defending serial murderer John George Haigh in 1949. Reputedly, he would arrive at the House of Commons at around 5.00 pm, often stay throughout debates that lasted all night then, after a quick shave and breakfast, leave for court. He was assisted in his punishing schedule by his wife Sylvia, herself a Conservative Party worker.

Maxwell Fyfe played a leading role in drafting the party's Industrial Charter of 1947 and chaired the committee into Conservative Party organisation that resulted in the Maxwell Fyfe Report (1948–49). The report shifted the balance of electoral funding from the candidate to the party, with the intention of broadening the diversity of MPs. In practice, it may have had the effect of lending more power to constituency parties and making candidates more uniform.

Maxwell Fyfe was a champion of European integration and a member of the Parliamentary Assembly of the Council of Europe from August 1949 to May 1952, becoming the Chair of the Assembly's Committee on Legal and Administrative Questions, and rapporteur on the committee drafting the European Convention on Human Rights. In his memoirs he criticised Sir Anthony Eden for a negative stance that derailed the UK's opportunity to become a leader in Europe. Eden always rejected this and considered a libel action against Maxwell Fyfe.

Return to government

Home Secretary
Shortly before the United Kingdom general election of 1951, Maxwell Fyfe caused a stir when he appeared to hint in a radio interview that a Conservative government might legislate to curb the power of trade unions. When the Conservative Party was returned to power in the election, Churchill thought it unwise to appoint him Minister of Labour, and Maxwell Fyfe became both Home Secretary and cabinet minister for Welsh affairs. He was responsible for guiding several complicated pieces of legislation through the Commons, in particular those that established commercial television. He gained a reputation as a hard-working, thorough and reliable cabinet member.

In 1952, the Director General of MI5 (DG) was made directly answerable to the Home Secretary rather than the Prime Minister. Given this novel responsibility, Maxwell Fyfe issued the Maxwell Fyfe Directive which became the de facto constitution of the Security Service until the Security Service Act 1989 set it on a statutory basis. When Sir Percy Sillitoe resigned as DG in 1953, Maxwell Fyfe delegated the shortlisting of a successor to a committee of civil servants chaired by Sir Edward Bridges. The committee put forward Dick White and Sir Kenneth Strong. Maxwell Fyfe endorsed the committee's preference for White, observing to Churchill that an internal appointment would be good for the morale of the service.

Fyfe's assumption of office as Home Secretary heralded a reign of fear for male homosexuals. A stern advocate of existing legislation criminalising homosexual acts, he started a campaign to “rid England of this male vice … this plague” by dramatically increased arrests of male homosexuals through police surveillance and entrapment via the use of agents provocateurs, tapped telephones, forged documents and the absence of warrants. From 1,276 in prosecutions in 1939 for actual or attempted sodomy or gross indecency, a year after he had assumed the office of Home Secretary prosecutions had soared to 5,443. Fyfe subsequently sanctioned the establishment of the Wolfenden Report into homosexuality, but had he known its findings would recommend decriminalisation, it is unlikely he would have done so.

A conservative on the death penalty, Kilmuir was likewise conservative on the issue of homosexual rights, and led the opposition in the House of Lords to the implementation of the Wolfenden Committee report, which had recommended the decriminalisation of homosexual acts between consenting adults.

This was ironic, says Geraldine Bedell, since it was he, while Home Secretary, who had set up the committee to consider whether the law should be changed. As Bedell also notes: "Perhaps he thought, by handing over to a committee, to shelve the issue. Perhaps he assumed Wolfenden would find against, in which case, he chose a curious chairman, because Wolfenden had a gay son, Jeremy." Kilmuir still opposed liberalisation when a bill was introduced in the Lords (by Lord Arran) in 1965. Says Bedell: "For the opposition, Lord Kilmuir warned against licensing the 'buggers' clubs' which he claimed were operating behind innocent-looking doors all over London." Maxwell Fyfe told the Conservative backbencher Sir Robert Boothby, who was known in parliamentary circles to be bisexual, that it was not his intention to legalise homosexuality: "I am not going down in history", he told Boothby, "as the man who made sodomy legal."

During his tenure as Home Secretary, he was embroiled in the controversy surrounding the hanging of Derek Bentley. Maxwell Fyfe had controversially refused to grant a reprieve to Bentley despite the written petitions of 200 MPs and the claim that Bentley was mentally retarded allegedly having a mental age of only 11. However, on most issues he was on the progressive wing of the Conservative Party, opposing the proposals in 1953 for the re-introduction of corporal punishment.

Lord Chancellor
Maxwell Fyfe remained ambitious and a Daily Mirror opinion poll in 1954, on the popular favourite to succeed Churchill as Party leader and prime minister, had him behind Eden and Butler but well ahead of Macmillan. However, once it was clear that Eden was to be Churchill's successor, he sought the office of Lord Chancellor.

On 19 October 1954 he was raised to the peerage as Viscount Kilmuir, of Creich in the County of Sutherland, and moved to the House of Lords and the "woolsack". Lord Kilmuir was a political Lord Chancellor, not restricting himself to his judicial role. He worked on many government issues including the constitution of Malta, which he wanted to become part of the UK, and the creation of the Restrictive Practices Court. In his eight years in the post he only sat as a judge on 24 appeals to the House of Lords. Lord Kilmuir opposed Sydney Silverman's 1956 private member's bill to abolish capital punishment. He described it as "an unwise and dangerous measure, the presence of which on the statute book would be a disaster for the country and a menace to the people". However, Kilmuir chaired the cabinet committee that recommended limiting the death penalty's scope and which led to the Homicide Act 1957. He feared the consequences of immigration to the United Kingdom and presented a report to the cabinet in 1956. Lord Kilmuir contended that the military intervention in the 1956 Suez Crisis was justified under the self-defence provisions of Article 51 of the United Nations Charter.

He continued in this office in the governments of Anthony Eden and Harold Macmillan until Macmillan's 1962 "Night of the Long Knives", when he was abruptly replaced by Sir Reginald Manningham-Buller, the Attorney-General. Kilmuir was made Baron Fyfe of Dornoch, of Dornoch in the County of Sutherland, and Earl of Kilmuir on 20 July 1962 to cushion the blow of retirement. He is said to have complained to Macmillan that he was being sacked with less notice than would be given to a cook, to which Macmillan replied that it was easier to get Lord Chancellors than good cooks.

After government
After government, Kilmuir joined the board of directors of Plessey but his health soon declined. He died at Withyham, Sussex, on 27 January 1967 and was cremated. His ashes were buried at the church of St Michael and All Angels at Withyham. His wealth at death was £22,202. His titles, which could pass only to sons, became extinct, as he had fathered only daughters.

Family and personality
He married Sylvia Harrison in 1925 and they had three daughters, one of whom pre-deceased him. Lalage Fyfe (b. 1926, d. 1944) and Pamela Maxwell Fyfe (b. 1928). His brother-in-law was the actor Sir Rex Harrison.

Kilmuir was a formidable parliamentary presence on behalf of his party, and his remarkable memory compensated for a dull speaking style, though he was capable of passion when the circumstances were right. In appearance, "His body was pear-shaped, and beneath a large square bald head there were dark heavy eyebrows and a face of middle-eastern pallor and swarthiness".

As Home Secretary, he often travelled to Wales, and in the valleys of South Wales he was nicknamed Dai Bananas, Fyffes being, then as now, one of Britain's major importers of the fruit.

Honours
Among his honours were:
 King's Counsel (KC) (1934)
 Knighthood (Kt) (1942)
 Privy Councillor (PC) (1945)
 Viscount Kilmuir (1954)
 Earl of Kilmuir (1962)
 Knight Grand Cross in the Royal Victorian Order (GCVO) (1953);
Honorary degrees including:
University of Oxford;
University of Manitoba (LL.D) 1954.
University of Edinburgh  (LL.D) 1955.
University of Wales;
University of Ottawa (LL.D) 16 September 1960.
Visitor of St Antony's College, Oxford (1953); and
Rector of the University of St Andrews (1956).

Portrayal in drama
David Maxwell Fyfe has been portrayed by the following actors in film, television and theatre productions;
 Iain Cuthbertson in the 1991 British/French film Let Him Have It
 Christopher Plummer in the 2000 Canadian/U.S. TV production Nuremberg
Julian Wadham in the 2006 British television docudrama Nuremberg: Nazis on Trial
Mel Smith in the 2007 British television drama Consenting Adults
John Warnaby in Nicholas de Jongh's stage play, Plague Over England (London, 2009)
There is also a film being made about him called Under an English Heaven by his grandson Tom Blackmore.
Zdzisław Mrożewski in the Polish film Epilog norymberski

References

Bibliography
Obituaries:
The Times, 28 January 1967
The Guardian, 28 January 1967

Dutton, D. J. (2004)"Fyfe, David Patrick Maxwell, Earl of Kilmuir (1900–1967)", Oxford Dictionary of National Biography, Oxford University Press, accessed 4 Aug 2007 

Lord Kilmuir (1964) Political Adventure
 
Tusa, A. & Tusa, J. (1983) The Nuremberg Trial

External links
 
 
The Papers of Lord Kilmuir held at Churchill Archives Centre

|-

1900 births
1967 deaths
Alumni of Balliol College, Oxford
Maxwell Fyfe, David
British Anglicans
Maxwell Fyfe, David
Earls in the Peerage of the United Kingdom
English King's Counsel
English barristers
Knights Bachelor
Knights Grand Cross of the Royal Victorian Order
Lord chancellors of Great Britain
Members of Gray's Inn
Maxwell Fyfe, David
Members of the Privy Council of the United Kingdom
Ministers in the Churchill caretaker government, 1945
Ministers in the Churchill wartime government, 1940–1945
Ministers in the Eden government, 1955–1957
Ministers in the Macmillan and Douglas-Home governments, 1957–1964
Ministers in the third Churchill government, 1951–1955
Earls created by Elizabeth II
People educated at George Watson's College
Politicians from Edinburgh
Maxwell Fyfe, David
20th-century King's Counsel
Rectors of the University of St Andrews
Maxwell Fyfe, David
Maxwell Fyfe, David
Maxwell Fyfe, David
Maxwell Fyfe, David
Maxwell Fyfe, David
Maxwell Fyfe, David
UK MPs who were granted peerages
Lawyers from Edinburgh